This article contains information about the literary events and publications of 1870.

Events

January 19 – Ivan Turgenev attends and writes about the public execution by guillotine of the spree killer Jean-Baptiste Troppmann outside the gates of La Roquette Prisons in Paris.
March 7 – Thomas Hardy meets his first wife, Emma Gifford, in Cornwall.
March 28 – Serialisation of Kenward Philp's The Bowery Detective in The Fireside Companion (New York) begins, the first known story to include the word detective in the title.
April–September – The serialisation of Charles Dickens' last novel, The Mystery of Edwin Drood, is left unfinished on his death on June 9 at Gads Hill Place in Kent, from a stroke, aged 58.
May – Karl May begins a second four-year prison sentence for thefts and frauds, at Waldheim, Saxony.
Spring – Serial publication begins of Aleksis Kivi's only novel Seitsemän veljestä ("Seven Brothers"), the first notable novel in the Finnish language.
August 24/25 – Libraries of the University of Strasbourg and the City of Strasbourg at Temple Neuf are destroyed by fire during the Siege of Strasbourg in the Franco-Prussian War, resulting in the loss of 3,446 medieval manuscripts, including the original 12th-century Hortus deliciarum compiled by Herrad of Landsberg, the Apologist codex containing the only text of the early Epistle to Diognetus, and rare Renaissance books.
September 17 – The first performance of Alexander Pushkin's play Boris Godunov (1825) is given at the Mariinsky Theatre in Saint Petersburg by members of the Alexandrinsky Theatre.
c. September 20 – Friedrich Engels moves permanently to London from Manchester.
December 18 – The Russian literary weekly Niva («Ни́ва», "Cornfield") is first published by Adolf Marks in Saint Petersburg.
unknown date – Construction of the David Sassoon Library in Bombay, India, is completed.

New books

Fiction
William Harrison Ainsworth - Talbot Harland
Thomas Bailey Aldrich – The Story of a Bad Boy
Thomas Archer – The Terrible Sights of London
Rhoda Broughton – Red as a Rose is She
Wilkie Collins – Man and Wife
Annie Denton Cridge - Man's Rights; Or, How Would You Like It? Comprising Dreams
José Maria de Eça de Queiroz and Ramalho Ortigão –  (The Mystery of the Sintra Road)
Charles Dickens – The Mystery of Edwin Drood
Benjamin Disraeli – Lothair
Fyodor Dostoevsky – The Eternal Husband («Вечный муж», Vechny muzh)
Edward Jenkins – Ginx's Baby: his birth and other misfortunes
Mór Jókai – Fekete gyémántok (Black Diamonds, i. e. coal)
Aleksis Kivi – Seitsemän veljestä (Seven Brothers)
Jonas Lie – Den Fremsynte (The Visionary or Pictures From Nordland)
George Meredith – The Adventures of Harry Richmond (begins serial publication)
William Morris – The Earthly Paradise
Charles Reade - Put Yourself in His Place
Leopold von Sacher-Masoch – Venus in Furs (Venus im Pelz)
Mikhail Saltykov-Shchedrin – The History of a Town («История одного города», Istoriya odnogo goroda)
Bayard Taylor – Joseph and His Friend: A Story of Pennsylvania
Anthony Trollope 
An Editor's Tales
The Vicar of Bullhampton
Ivan Turgenev - Stepnoy korol Lir (Степной король Лир); novella, English translation: King Lear of the Steppes
Jules Verne
Twenty Thousand Leagues Under the Sea (Vingt mille lieues sous les mers)
Around the Moon (Autour de la Lune)
Charlotte M. Yonge – The Caged Lion

Children and young people
John Neal — Great Mysteries and Little Plagues

Drama
James Albery – Two Roses
Ludwig Anzengruber (as L. Gruber) – Der Pfarrer von Kirchfeld (The Priest of Kirchfeld)
Henry James Byron – Uncle Dick's Darling
Pietro Cossa – Nero
Lydia Koidula
Maret ja Miina (or Kosjakased; The Betrothal Birches)
Saaremaa Onupoeg (The Cousin from Saaremaa)
Lord Newry – Ecarte
George Sand and Sarah Bernhardt – L'Autre
Aleksey Konstantinovich Tolstoy – Tsar Boris («Царь Борис», published)

Poetry

Bret Harte – The Heathen Chinee
Edward Lear – Nonsense Songs, Stories, Botany, and Alphabets (dated 1871), including "The Owl and the Pussycat"
Giovanni Marradi – Canzone moderne
Dante Gabriel Rossetti – Poems, including "Jenny" and a fragment of "The House of Life"

Non-fiction
J. E. Austen-Leigh – A Memoir of Jane Austen
Brewer's Dictionary of Phrase and Fable (1st edition)
Richard William Church – Life of St. Anselm
Thomas Wentworth Higginson - Army Life in a Black Regiment
Hargrave Jennings – The Rosicrucians, their Rites and Mysteries
Henry Maudsley – Body and Mind
William Robinson – The Wild Garden
Charles Dudley Warner - My Summer in a Garden and Calvin, A Study of Character

Births
January 3 – Henry Handel Richardson (Ethel Florence Lindesay Richardson), Australian novelist (died 1946)
March 5 – Frank Norris, American novelist (died 1902)
April 7 – Gustav Landauer, German philosopher and revolutionary (murdered 1919)
June 25 – Erskine Childers, Irish novelist (executed 1922)
July 27 – Hilaire Belloc, French-born English writer, poet and satirist (died 1953)
October 18 – Petre P. Negulescu, Romanian philosopher (died 1951)
October 22 (October 10 OS) – Ivan Bunin, Russian-born writer, recipient of Nobel Prize in Literature (died 1953)
October 29 – Gerald Duckworth, English publisher (died 1937)
December 17 – Ioan A. Bassarabescu, Romanian short story writer and politician (died 1952)
December 18 – Saki (Hector Hugh Munro), English short story writer and dramatist (killed in action 1916)

Deaths
January 21 – Alexander Herzen, Russian writer (born 1812)
February 25 – Henrik Hertz, Danish poet (born 1797)
April 24 – Louisa Stuart Costello, Irish writer on history and travel (born 1799)
June 9 – Charles Dickens, English novelist (born 1812)
June 11 – William Gilmore Simms, American poet, novelist and historian (born 1806)
June 24 – Adam Lindsay Gordon, Australian poet (born 1833)
July 19 – Benjamin Thorpe, scholar of Old English (born c. 1782)
July 20 – Jules de Goncourt, French novelist and critic (syphilis, born 1830)
July 24 – Anders Abraham Grafström, Swedish poet and historian (born 1790)
July 30 – Aasmund Olavsson Vinje, Norwegian journalist and poet (born 1818)
September 12 – Fitz Hugh Ludlow, American author and explorer (born 1836)
September 23 – Prosper Mérimée, French writer (b. 1803)
November 4 – Comte de Lautreamont (Isidore Lucien Ducasse), French poet and writer (born 1846)
December 5 – Alexandre Dumas, père, French novelist (born 1802)

References

 
Years of the 19th century in literature